David Coleman Dukes (June 6, 1945 – October 9, 2000) was an American character actor. He had a long career in films, appearing in 35. Dukes starred in the miniseries The Winds of War and War and Remembrance, and he was a frequent television guest star. Later in life, Dukes had recurring roles on shows such as Pauly, Sisters and Dawson's Creek.

Early life
Dukes was born in San Francisco, California, the son of a California Highway Patrol Officer. Dukes was the eldest of four boys: David, James, Robert and Joe Paul.

Career
Dukes's film career included 35 movies. Throughout his career, he was a television guest star, notably as the man who attempted to rape Edith Bunker on All in the Family, an advertising executive on The Jeffersons, and as a blind bully on Three's Company. During the 1980s, Dukes appeared in the dual miniseries The Winds of War and War and Remembrance. He received an Emmy nomination for best supporting actor for his role in The Josephine Baker Story (1991) and appeared as Arthur Miller in Norma Jean & Marilyn (1996). He was a regular on the first season of Sisters, playing the transvestite husband of oldest sister Alex (Swoosie Kurtz). Dukes's role became a recurring character in subsequent seasons. On Dawson's Creek, he had the recurring role of Mr. McPhee, father to Jack (Kerr Smith) and Andie (Meredith Monroe) from the second through fourth seasons. He also starred in Without a Trace as the ex-husband of Kate Nelligan.

Theater
Dukes had considerable stage experience, first appearing on Broadway in 1971. He later appeared in a revival of Molière's The School for Wives. Dukes' theatrical roles included as Dracula, Doctor Frankenstein, and Antonio Salieri in the original production of Amadeus, replacing Ian McKellen. He also replaced John Lithgow in the original production of David Henry Hwang's play M. Butterfly, and he received a Tony nomination in 1980 for best featured actor in a play for Bent. In 1998, he was one of the three characters in a London West End production of 'Art' with Stacy Keach and George Wendt.

Audio
David Dukes recorded several audiobooks, including Philip Roth's unabridged Sabbath’s Theater and Isaac Asimov's unabridged Prelude to Foundation.

Personal life 
He married his first wife, Carolyn McKenzie, on October 9, 1965 when he was a student at the College of Marin. Their son, Shawn David Dukes, was born on March 31, 1966. Dukes also had a daughter Annie by his second wife Carol Muske.

Death 
Dukes died of a heart attack on October 9, 2000, in Spanaway, Washington, while on location shooting the Stephen King miniseries Rose Red. Dukes is interred in the Forest Lawn Memorial Park Cemetery in Glendale, California.

At the end of Season 4 Episode 7 of Dawson's Creek "You Had Me At Goodbye" (aired on November 15, 2000 and in which Dukes appeared) an image of him with the word "In Loving Memory David Dukes 1945 - 2000" is displayed.

Filmography

Film

Television

References

Further reading
 "David Dukes." Variety. October 11, 2000.
 Susan King and Don Shirley. "David Dukes; Versatile Character Actor on Screen, Stage." Los Angeles Times. October 11, 2000.
 Tom Vallance. "David Dukes." The Independent (London). October 17, 2000.

External links

Remembering David Dukes
Problems with the county medical examiner, from his wife's official website
 David Dukes papers, 1946-2004, held by the Billy Rose Theatre Division, New York Public Library for the Performing Arts

1945 births
2000 deaths
American male film actors
American male television actors
Male actors from San Francisco
People from Staten Island
People from Lakewood, Washington
Burials at Forest Lawn Memorial Park (Glendale)
20th-century American male actors